The city of Ottawa, Canada held municipal elections on November 8, 1982.

Mayor Marion Dewar was re-elected, defeating conservative Darrel Kent.

Mayor

Ottawa City Council

Ottawa Board of Education Trustees
Six to be elected in each zone
 

 

4 to be elected 

1 to be elected

References
Ottawa Citizen, November 9, 1982

Municipal elections in Ottawa
Ottawa
1980s in Ottawa
Ottawa municipal election
Ottawa municipal election